Taşpınar is a town (belde) and municipality in the Aksaray District, Aksaray Province, Turkey. Its population is 2,759 (2021).

Geography 

Taşpınar is in the Anatolian plateau, just west of Mount Hasan.

History 

The earliest residents of the village were the members of a tribe from Azerbaijan in 1515. Eventually, people from nearby villages also settled in Taşpınar. In 1957 Taşpınar was declared a seat of township.

Economy 

The main economic activity is handmade rugs. Taşpınar rugs are especially famous for their high density of knots. (40·40 in 10 cm² or more in older rugs.) Although the town is situated in a volcanic plateau which is supposed to be fertile, because of the low annual rainfall, agricultural income is limited. Some Taşpınar residents work in the light industry of nearby Aksaray.

Transportation 

References 

Populated places in Aksaray District
Towns in Turkey